You're Nobody 'til Somebody Kills You is a 2011 film directed by Michael A. Pinckney. The film stars James McDaniel, Michael K. Williams, Michael Mosley and Nashawn Kearse.

The film began production in May 2007, and premiered at Brooklyn's Williamsburg International Film Festival dubbed "WILLiFEST" on September 23, 2011.

Cast
James McDaniel as Detective Johnson
Michael Mosley as Detective Francelli
Nashawn Kearse as Manchild
Assiatou Lea as Terrell
Kevin Carroll as Maurice Murray
Neko Parham as Dennis
Jacinto Taras Riddick as Mr. Mann
Suzette Gunn as Kiki
Michael K. Williams as A.D.
Jessica Blank as Felicia Roman
Kia Goodwin as Michelle Malone
Doug E. Fresh as Rob Ski
Felix Solis as Detective Meil
Chance Kelly as L.T. Harrington
Shyheim as Wise
Adriane Lenox as Mother Malone
Michael DenDekker as Reporter
Greg Nice as Nice & Smooth
Big Daddy Kane as Himself

References

External links

2011 films
2010s English-language films
American thriller films
2010s American films